Lisa Matviyenko (born 6 October 1997) is an inactive German tennis player. Eva Lys is her younger sister, and also a tennis player.
 
Matviyenko made her WTA Tour main-draw debut at the 2021 Hamburg European Open in the doubles competition where she and partner Sina Herrmann lost to Astra Sharma and Rosalie van der Hoek.

References

External links
 
 

1997 births
Living people
German female tennis players
German people of Ukrainian descent